The 1997 Premier Development Soccer League season was its 3rd. The season began in April 1997 and ended in August 1997.

Central Coast Roadrunners successfully defended the championship, defeating the Cocoa Expos 3-2.  Spokane Shadow won the regular season title, winning 14 games to 2 losses.

Changes from 1996 season

Name changes
 Miami Tango changed their name to Miami Breakers.
 Puget Sound Hammerheads merged with the D-3 Pro's Everett BigFoot to become Puget Sound BigFoot.
 Southern California Gunners changed their name to Southern California Chivas.

New teams 
6 teams were added for the season.

Teams Leaving
The Nashville Metros were promoted to the A League. The Arizona Sahuaros (formerly the Arizona Phoenix), Austin Lone Stars, Fort Lauderdale Strikers (formerly Florida Strikers), and San Francisco Bay Seals were promoted to the D-3 Pro League.

6 teams folded after the 1996 season:
 Birmingham Grasshoppers
 Fontana Falcons
 Oklahoma City Heat
 Orlando Lions
 Roanoke River Dawgs
 San Diego Top Guns

The Wichita Blue went on hiatus for this year, and the Willamette Valley Firebirds went on hiatus for the next two years.

Standings

Central Conference

Central Division

North Central Division

Eastern Conference

Mid-South Division

Southeast Division

Western Conference

Northwest Division

Southwest Division

Playoffs

Format 
Central Coast received a bye to the PDL Semifinals as the defending champion.
The top four teams from every division except the Southwest earn playoff spots.  With Central Coast already receiving a bye, the top two teams from the Southwest Division will play each other, however if Central Coast is in the top two, then the third place team receives a playoff spot.  The Division winners would then face each other in the Conference finals.

Divisional brackets

PDSL Finals Brackets

References

1997
4